Abulfat Asad oghlu Aliyev (December 30, 1926 – December 27, 1990) was an Azerbaijani opera and mugham singer, People's Artist of the Azerbaijan SSR.

Biography
Abulfat Aliyev was born on December 30, 1926, in Shusha. After his father's death Aliyev's family moved from Shusha to Fuzuli where they lived for four years. Then his family moved to Aghdam and he continued his education at city school. For the first time he sang the song "Shushanin Daghlari" on the radio. At that time 19-year-old Abulfat moved to Baku.

From 1945 he became a soloist of Azerbaijan State Academic Philharmonic Hall. The repertoire of the singer included more than 400 folk and composer songs such as "Dina bilmadim", "Bu gala, dashli qala", "Ay Pari", "Endim bulag bashina", "Bulbullar gazar baghi", "Tel nazik", "Sachlari burma", "Gel-gel", "Xal yanaghinda", "Gara gozlum".

In 1956 he appeared on the stage of Opera and Ballet Theater for the first time. Aliyev worked there until 1962.

The singer, who took part in the International Music Congress in Moscow in 1971, was awarded a UNESCO badge and diploma for high performance, and his performance was broadcast on All-Union Radio.

Aliyev died on December 27, 1990, in Baku.

Memorial 
 December 27, 1994 – Memorial evening at Azerbaijan State Academic Philharmonic Hall
 2004 – A documentary about Abulfat Aliyev

Awards and honorary titles
 Honored Artist of the Azerbaijan SSR – 26 April 1958
 People's Artist of the Azerbaijan SSR – 29 June 1964
 UNESCO badge – 1971

References

External links 
Abulfat Aliyev's profile on Discogs

Soviet people
1926 births
1990 deaths
Musicians from Shusha
20th-century Azerbaijani male opera singers
Operatic tenors
Burials at II Alley of Honor